Imelcana is a genus of moths of the family Tortricidae.

Species
Imelcana camelina Razowski & Wojtusiak, 2006

Etymology
The genus name is an anagram of the name of the type-species.

See also
List of Tortricidae genera

References

 , 2006: Tortricidae from Venezuela (Lepidoptera: Tortricidae). Shilap Revista de Lepidopterologia 34 133): 35–79. Full article:

External links

tortricidae.com

Euliini
Tortricidae genera